Wei Zhao (born August 29, 1983, Tianjin) is a former Chinese-born Hong Kong professional footballer who played as a goalkeeper.

International career
On 3 June 2011, Wei won his first and only cap for the Hong Kong national football team in an international friendly match against Malaysia national football team, where he conceded the equalizer from Abdul Hadi Yahya in the 66th minute of the game, which ended in a 1-1 draw.

References

External links
Player profile at Sodasoccer.com

1983 births
Living people
Chinese footballers
Hong Kong footballers
Footballers from Tianjin
Guangzhou F.C. players
Hong Kong First Division League players
Expatriate footballers in Hong Kong
Chinese expatriate sportspeople in Hong Kong
South China AA players
Sun Hei SC players
Tuen Mun SA players
Hong Kong Rangers FC players
Hong Kong international footballers
Association football goalkeepers
Hong Kong League XI representative players